WWE: Uncaged is the name of a series of albums featuring unreleased theme songs mostly written and performed by Jim Johnston. The first album was released on December 16, 2016, and so far there have been fifteen albums released in total as of February 8, 2021. Starting from WWE: Uncaged XI, the albums were released around the 'Big Four' pay-per-view events (Royal Rumble, WrestleMania, SummerSlam, and Survivor Series). However, there have been no new releases since February 2021, leaving the future of the series in doubt.

See also

References

WWE albums